Gogi Saroj Pal (born 1945, Neoli, Uttar Pradesh, India) is an eminent Indian artist. She works in multiple media, including gouache, oil, ceramic and weaving. Her works usually have women as their subject, and many of her paintings have a fantastical element that still comments on the female condition. Her early works were more realistic, but over time she has moved to simpler, more stylized paintings that have considerable impact.

She has a diploma in painting from the College of Art in Lucknow, Uttar Pradesh, India. Over the years she has had nearly 30 solo shows and won numerous awards including the National Award from Lalit Kala Akademi. She also participated in a large number of group shows both in India and overseas: Yugoslavia, Germany, France, Cuba and Japan among others.

She currently lives and works in New Delhi.

Education 
Pal studied at the College of Art in Banasthali, Rajasthan from 1961-1962 after which she obtained a Diploma in Painting from the Government College of Arts and Crafts in Lucknow in 1962-67. She also pursued a Postgraduate in painting from the College of Art in Delhi in 1968. 

She realised early in life that she wanted to become an artist. Her uncle being a famous writer she was exposed to the literary world and the arts. Her family was skeptical about her becoming an artist as in that era there were very few artists and almost no female artists. She knew that to become an artist, she would have to enroll in an art school.

Career 
Gogi Saroj Pal began teaching in 1970 as a lecturer at the Women's Polytechnic in New Delhi. She eventually returned to her postgraduate alma mater, College of Art, New Delhi where she taught for a year in 1975-76. She also lectured at the art Department of Jamia Millia Islamia University, New Delhi in 1979- 80 and 1982-83.

Personal life

She married a fellow artist and friend Ved Nayar who is a sculptor. In Delhi, she was working as a freelance artist and also taught at art institutions. She suffered from various forms of illnesses, including getting her hip joint replaced. The replacement left her incapacitated as the muscles couldn't cope the replacement for a long time, leaving her in excruciating pain. In an interview she said that it was her art which helped her get through the pain and the difficult time.

Commentary on her style 
According to the authors in the book- 'Gogi Saroj Pal: the feminine unbound', Gogi's women appeared to be feminine, sensuous, coquettish but they could equally be bovine, obdurate and slovenly. There was an element of dressing up but not with ornamentation or apparel. The nudity of her feminine figures, 'Nayikas' was fiercely commented on and debated over- was it part of the country's spiritual tradition or was she continuing to be the quintessential rebel? Gogi herself gave no explanations as the work speaks for itself. She is most interested in exploring how myth influences and reflects society.

Art critic Richard Bartholomew would see in them 'lonely people'. In 1990, in an art catalogue, Art writer Shamim Hanfi described her work as having a 'quiet restlessness' that creates 'a feeling of unexpressed sadness'.

In the initial stages of her experimentation with her work and her early works in lithography in 1979, Bartholomew would sense the solitariness of her 'faces, portraits, images, children with legs crossed, arms folded, recumbent figures, groups of people staring quietly, privately, personally into some past or future'

Of specific interest are 'the suggestive eyes and delicate mouth, the posture, the placement of the hand, the unselfconscious attitude- 'all create a sense of intimacy', a trait that would mark her entire career as an artist.

Her work suggested two things to Bartholomew, firstly, that 'humanity is life in Gogi's work; and life is an assortment of human beings, and life is thought', which was prescient of the manner in which she would continue to develop, and second, that hers is a 'poignant world of real people but the reality of the world and of the personae has been made an abstract principle'.

Artworks

Being Women 

According to Seema Bawa :

Gogi Saroj Pal’s Being a Woman series focus on her concern of the place women have in society. In this evocative painting, the women has been rendered in a likeness of Christ’s crucifixion, but without a cross. The outstretched hands, the slight slumping of the head and the way in which the legs seems pinned together are reminiscent of Christ’s torment. ‘There is so much celebration of pain, we are reminded of how much he suffered on our account.’ the artist says, ‘but what of the anguish of women.’ Gogi Saroj pal finds it ironic that people shed tears on Christ’s suffering, but are unmoved by our overlook of sorrows of the women in their own surroundings- weather mother, sister, wife, partner, friend or daughter. This painted sisterhood of grief gives this work a powerful poignancy.

Tribute to Dr Rahat Indori 

Gogi Saroj Pal was one of the 9 select artists who paid their tribute to Dr Rahat Indori by creating painting inspired by his Ghazals. Gogi Saroj Pal created painting on the famous ghazal- Jitne Apne The , Sab Paray The. The Ghazal is composed by Aashran Mahajan as part of tribute. Dr Rahat Indori - Ek Alag Pehchaen - A Tribute by Indie Musicians & Artists

Awards and honours  

 1978, 1979, 1981 - Group 8 Medals at All India Graphic Prints Exhibition, Chandigarh and New Delhi
 1980 - Sanskriti Award, New Delhi
 1981-82 - Fellowship of Lalit Kala Akademi, Garhi Artists' Studios, New Delhi
 1986-88 - Fellowship, Department of Culture, New Delhi
 1987- Jury's commendation. certificate in the First International Biennial of Plastic Arts, Algeria
 1990 - National Award, Lalit Kala Akademi, New Delhi
 1995 - 12th Cleveland International Drawing Biennial, Middlesbrough, U.K.

References

Further reading
 Mary-Ann Milford-Lutzker, Five Artists from India: Gogi Saroj Pal, Rekha Rodwittiya, Navjot, Anupam Sud, Rummana Hussain, Woman's Art Journal, Vol. 23, No. 2 (Autumn, 2002 - Winter, 2003), pp. 21–27 accessed at  22 February 2007 - subscription only

External links
Her website (jointly with artist Ved Nayar) includes pictures of her art
Profile of the artist on Delhi Art Gallery website
Includes a photograph of the artist and two of her works
Item that shows one of her paintings
A bouquet of flowerscapes, The Tribune, 13 February 2004

1945 births
20th-century Indian painters
Living people
Indian women painters
20th-century Indian women artists
Women artists from Uttar Pradesh
Painters from Uttar Pradesh
21st-century Indian women artists